Deborah R. Hensler (born 1942) is an American academic and researcher, currently the Judge John W. Ford Professor of Dispute Resolution at Stanford Law School.  Professor Hensler holds a Ph.D in Political Science from the Massachusetts Institute of Technology and an honorary doctorate by Leuphana University.

References

1942 births
Living people
Stanford Law School faculty
MIT School of Humanities, Arts, and Social Sciences alumni
Hunter College alumni